Clinton Bernard LeSueur (born March 2, 1969) is an American journalist and political aide. He has worked in Mississippi and Washington, D.C., and was the unsuccessful Republican candidate for the U.S. House of Representatives in Mississippi's 2nd congressional district in 2002 and 2004.

Personal life
LeSueur was born and reared in Holly Springs, a suburb of Memphis, Tennessee. His father was a Church of God in Christ minister.  The tenth of fifteen children, LeSueur earned a Bachelor of Science degree in print journalism from historically black Rust College, a liberal arts institution in Holly Springs. He then received a master's degree in political science from American University in Washington, D.C.

He worked as a news reporter for the Afro-American Newspaper, one of the oldest black-owned newspapers in United States. He left there to work as a news assistant at USA Today, where he received the "Voice of Courage" award for writing about health issues. Later, he became lead reporter for TV Technology Magazine, for which he covered the Federal Communications Commission and the Consumer and Regulatory Affairs Committee on Capitol Hill.

He became the legislative writer for Washington, D.C., City Council member Adrian M. Fenty.

He has served on the I Have A Dream Foundation, a nationwide network of projects dedicated to keeping at-risk children in school and named for Martin Luther King Jr.'s 1963 "I Have A Dream" speech. LeSueur completed a one-year program as an AmeriCorps volunteer, in which he mentor students in local urban schools.

Prior to his relocation to Washington, LeSueur had resided in Greenville, Mississippi.

Political career
LeSueur grew up as a Democrat. He switched his party affiliation to Republican in 2001 after becoming disenchanted with the Democratic party's stances on abortion and gay marriage. He struggled with that decision for some time, even to the point of saying, "Lord, I don't want to be a Republican!" In 2002, he ran as the Republican candidate in Mississippi's 2nd congressional district against incumbent Democrat Bennie Thompson, who still holds this seat. LeSueur ran on a strongly socially conservative platform but was defeated by Thompson, 55.1 to 42.7 percent. LeSueur took comfort in his showing given the heavily Democratic tilt of the district and the fact that LeSueur received little encouragement from the national GOP.

He challenged Thompson again in 2004. This time, he attracted more attention from the national party, and spoke at the 2004 Republican National Convention. He lost again, receiving 40.6 percent of the vote. To date, he is the only Republican to have made a credible bid against Thompson.

On July 1, 2005, LeSueur was appointed director of the Delta Regional Authority (DRA) faith-based initiative.

References

1969 births
20th-century American journalists
African-American journalists
African-American people in Mississippi politics
American Pentecostals
American University School of Public Affairs alumni
American male journalists
Candidates in the 2002 United States elections
Candidates in the 2004 United States elections
Journalists from Mississippi
Journalists from Washington, D.C.
Living people
Mississippi Democrats
Mississippi Republicans
People from Holly Springs, Mississippi
Politicians from Greenville, Mississippi
Rust College alumni